Mongoliin Ünen (Cyrillic: Монголын үнэн, spelt Mongoliin ynen in the Latin alphabet from 1931 to 1941, ; "Mongolian Truth") is a Mongolian daily newspaper and the central organ of the Mongolian People's Party. It was founded in 1920. During the socialist period, it was the main print media, with a circulation of 145,000.

In 1921–1922, the newspaper was known as Uria (Уриа, "Call"). In 1923, it changed its name to Ardyn Erkh (Ардын эрх, "People's Right") and then in 1925 to Ünen (Үнэн, spelt Ynen in the Latin alphabet from 1931 to 1941; "Truth"), reverting to Ardyn Erkh in the 1990s and 2000s (after the Democratic Revolution), before being renamed back to Mongoliin Ünen in 2010.

References

Newspapers published in Mongolia
Newspapers established in 1920
Communist newspapers